Long Live the Victory of Mao Zedong Thought is an epoxy resin statue in Shenyang, Liaoning, China. The monument is located on Zhongshan Square in the center of the city. The statue is one of the largest of Chairman Mao Zedong in the country. It is one of the main provincial Cultural Revolution-era monuments not removed in later years.

The monument was erected by students from the Art Academy, who worked for two years on the project. They were supervised by a committee of peasants and workers. It was inaugurated on October 1, 1970, during the 21st anniversary celebrations of the founding of the People's Republic of China. The phrase "Long Live the Victory of Mao Zedong Thought" was carved on the front of the base.

Its base is surrounded by statues of 58 'worker-peasant-soldier heroes'. They are divided into eight groups, representing different struggles of the Chinese people under the leadership of Chairman Mao. Most of the surrounding characters originally carried Little Red Books, but most of these have been removed. The first group represents soldiers and civilians, propagating the appeal of the 9th National Congress of the Chinese Communist Party ("Unite to win still greater victories"). The group of statues at back of the base is titled "Party Building", and seeks to display the early phase of the Communist Party. The three groups on the left ("A Single Spark Can Start a Prairie Fire", "Long Live the People's War" and "Carry the Revolution to the End") illustrate struggles during the Chinese Civil War. The remaining three groups ("Socialism is Good", "Long Live the Three Red Banners" and "Carry the Great Proletarian Cultural Revolution Through to the End") on the right side of the base illustrate the phase of socialist revolution.

References

Shenyang
1970 sculptures
Colossal statues in China
Statues of Mao Zedong
1970 establishments in China